Mary Holda, later Elrod (September 30, 1915 – April 14, 2016) was a utility infielder who played in the All-American Girls Professional Baseball League. She batted and threw right-handed.

A native of Mansfield, Ohio, Holda was one of the original South Bend Blue Sox founding members of the All-American Girls Professional Baseball League in its 1943 inaugural season. Known as "Bucky" by her teammates, she served primarily as a backup at third base and shortstop for South Bend. She was also available for pinch hitting duties, while posting a .205 batting average in 29 games.

Career statistics
Batting 

Fielding

Sources

All-American Girls Professional Baseball League players
South Bend Blue Sox players
Baseball players from Ohio
Sportspeople from Mansfield, Ohio
American centenarians
1915 births
2016 deaths
Women centenarians
21st-century American women